The Arboretum d'Élan is a small arboretum located in Élan, Ardennes, Grand Est, France. It is open daily without charge.

The arboretum was established by the Office National des Forêts (National Forestry Office) near the Chapelle Saint-Roger, an 18th-century chapel built to honor the founder of Élan Abbey (established 1148).

See also 
 List of botanical gardens in France

References 
 Le Pays des Sources au Val de Bar: La Chapelle Saint-Roger et l'Arboretum
 Centre national de documentation pédagogique (French)
 Ardennes brochure

Gardens in Ardennes (department)
Elan